Fraus simulans, the lesser ghost moth, is a moth of the family Hepialidae. It is endemic to the Australian Capital Territory, New South Wales, Queensland, South Australia, Tasmania, Victoria and Western Australia.

The wingspan is about 25 mm for males and 35 mm for females. Adults are brown, often with white streaks near the base, and a dark spot in the middle of each forewing. Adults are on wing from late March to early April in one generation per year.

The larvae feed on the foliage of various herbaceous plants, but mainly grasses, including Ecdeiocolea monostachya. They live in a tunnel and emerge at night to feed.

References

Moths described in 1856
Hepialidae